Amanul Haque (c. 19253 April 2013) was a Bangladeshi photographer. He was awarded Ekushey Padak in 2011 by the Government of Bangladesh.

Career
Haque joined Dhaka Medical College as an artist-photographer. He used to sketch human organs for medical students. During Bengali Language Movement in 1952, he took photographs of events with his camera which include the photograph of bullet-riddled body of activist Rafiq Uddin Ahmed.

Haque worked with Indian filmmaker Satyajit Ray as still photographer in the film Pather Panchali (1955). He published a photo album titled Prosongo Satyajit which features images of Ray shot by him.

Haque was never married.

References

1920s births
2013 deaths
Bangladeshi photographers
Recipients of the Ekushey Padak
Date of birth missing